Hopea bancana is a species of flowering plant in the family Dipterocarpaceae. It is endemic to Sumatra.

References

bancana
Endemic flora of Sumatra
Trees of Sumatra
Critically endangered flora of Asia
Taxonomy articles created by Polbot
Taxa named by Jacob Gijsbert Boerlage